Krykhivtsi is a big village at the southwestern edge of Ivano-Frankivsk, in Western Ukraine.
It belongs to Ivano-Frankivsk urban hromada, one of the hromadas of Ukraine. 

The village is located just west of Ivano-Frankivsk International Airport. South of it is located another village of Drohomyrchany, while to the west across the Bystrytsia of Solotvyn Krykhivtsi borders a village of Pidlissya (Ivano-Frankivsk Raion).

Until 18 July 2020, Krykhivtsi belonged to Ivano-Frankivsk Municipality. The municipality was abolished in July 2020 as part of the administrative reform of Ukraine, which reduced the number of raions of Ivano-Frankivsk Oblast to six. The area of Ivano-Frankivsk Municipality was merged into Ivano-Frankivsk Raion.

References

Villages in Ivano-Frankivsk Raion